John Edward Reagan (July 13, 1883 – May 18, 1941) was the father of Ronald Reagan, motion picture actor, who served as the 33rd governor of California and 40th president of the United States and radio station manager Neil Reagan.

Ancestry
Jack's paternal grandfather, Michael O'Regan, was a native of County Tipperary, Ireland. O'Regan worked as a tenant farmer during his early years in Ireland, before he moved to London in 1852. Whilst living there, O'Regan married an Irish refugee named Catherine Mulcahey, and anglicised his family surname to "Reagan". The couple emigrated to Carroll County, Illinois in 1856. John Michael, their son, became a grain-elevator farmer, and married Jenny Cusick in 1878. Cusick was born in Canada, but like John Michael, her parents came from Ireland. Their son, John Edward "Jack", was born five years later.

Life and career
At the time of his second son Ronald's birth in 1911, Jack was working at a store in Tampico, Illinois. He went on to work as a traveling salesman during Ronald's childhood. Politically, he was a populist Democrat, supporting economically progressive policies such as financial support for the working poor, trust-busting, child labor laws, a minimum wage, and progressive taxation. From his Irish heritage he inherited a dislike of the British Empire. He was a keen supporter of the United States' involvement in World War I and attempted to enlist. He was strongly opposed to the Ku Klux Klan due to his Catholic heritage, but also due to the Klan's anti-semitism and anti-black racism.

He died on May 19, 1941, at the age of 57 after a series of heart attacks, but may have survived if a nearby ambulance had been allowed to cross out of their service territory. In later years, this motivated his son Ronald Reagan to sign into law an act allowing the Paramedic program to start.

See also
 Birthplace of Ronald Reagan
 Pitney Variety Store

References

General
 
 
 
 
 

1883 births
1941 deaths
American people of Irish descent
Ronald Reagan
Reagan family
People from Fulton, Illinois
People from Lee County, Illinois
Burials at Calvary Cemetery (Los Angeles)
California Democrats
Illinois Democrats
Works Progress Administration workers
Fathers of presidents of the United States
People from Tampico, Illinois
Catholics from Illinois

pl:John Reagan